Johnson Stokes & Master (JSM) was one of the oldest and largest law firms in Asia before it was combined into Mayer Brown on January 28, 2008 to become Mayer Brown JSM. JSM had offices in Hong Kong, where it was one of the leading law firms, and in Beijing, Guangzhou and Shanghai on mainland China, as well as in Bangkok, Thailand and Hanoi and Ho Chi Minh City, Vietnam. Before the combination, the firm had a team of 800 staff, including more than 260 lawyers.
According to the firm, JSM was one of the top three foreign law firms in Thailand and Vietnam. On September 1, 2018, the firm changed its name in Asia to Mayer Brown.

History
Johnson Stokes & Master was established in 1863 in Hong Kong by Edmund Sharp as a sole proprietorship at a time when Hong Kong had less than a dozen practising lawyers. Later, an office in Shanghai, China was set up in 1893.
In 1895, Alfred Bulmer Johnson became senior partner of the firm with Alfred Stokes and Godfrey Master as supporting partners. At that time, JSM was already legal advisor to The Hongkong and Shanghai Banking Corporation, a major commercial establishment in Hong Kong.
On December 1, 1896, Johnson retired from private practice at the firm and also resigned his position of Crown Solicitor which he had held from 1882. On this occasion, the succession of the Crown Solicitor-ship was passed not to the firm's next in command - Stokes who was in Shanghai, China running the local branch of the firm - but to the next most senior solicitor in the Colony, Henry Lardner Dennys.
In July 1897, JSM engaged the firm's first local born solicitor - the Oxford-educated Wei Wah-on, son of a compradore of the Chartered Mercantile Bank.
In 1936, JSM moved into the air-conditioned offices of the Hongkong and Shanghai Banking Corporation Building.
After the Second World War, JSM resumed business in the Bank Building though Hong Kong was in a sorry state at that time.
Since then, the firm's growth paralleled Hong Kong's rapid economic development and it further expanded into other major Asian cities.

Awards
In 2008 JSM was awarded at the 2008 ALB Hong Kong Law Awards as the:
 Firm of the Year - Employment Law Firm of the Year
 Firm of the Year - Managing partner of the Year
 Firm of the Year - Hong Kong Law Firm of the Year

References

Defunct law firms
Law firms established in 1863
1863 establishments in Hong Kong
Law firms disestablished in 2008
2008 disestablishments in Hong Kong
Law firms of Hong Kong